Christiane Marlet (born 27 September 1954 at La Roche-sur-Yon) is a former French athlete, who specialised in the sprints.

Biography  
Appearing twice in  French athletics teams, she won the silver medal relay 4 × 1 lap during the 1972 European Indoor Championships 1972 at  Grenoble, alongside Michèle Beugnet,  Claudine Meire and Nicole Pani.

prize list

Records

notes and references

Sources 
 DocAthlé 2003, French Athletics Federation, p. 419

1954 births
Living people
French female sprinters
20th-century French women